Saeko is a feminine Japanese given name.

Possible writings
サエコ in katakana
さえこ in hiragana
紗子, "gauze, child"
小枝子, "little, bough, child"
紗江子, "gauze, creek, child"
冴子, "be clear, child"
佐江子, "assistant, creek, child"
佐恵子, "assistant, favor, child"
佐枝子, "assistant, bough, child"

People with the name
, Japanese actress and model
, Japanese singer and voice actress
, Japanese novelist, essayist, and playwright
, Japanese table tennis player
, Japanese synchronized swimmer
,  Japanese long jumper
, Japanese voice actress
, Anime Character from Haikyuu
, Japanese singer
, Japanese actress

Japanese feminine given names